Osvaldo Domínguez Dibb (born 1940) is a Paraguayan politician (candidate for president and senator), businessman and ex-president of Olimpia Asunción.

Career
Dibb is mostly known for being the most successful president in the history of Paraguayan football (soccer) club Olimpia. He served as president for the terms of 1974 to 1990 and from 1995 to 2004. Under his presidency, Olimpia won a large number of national championships, but most importantly the club won most of its international titles such as three Copa Libertadores, the Intercontinental Cup, the Copa Interamericana and the Recopa Sudamericana. All the mentioned titles catapulted Olimpia as one of the most respected football clubs in South America.

Dominguez also owned several companies in Paraguay including a newspaper company (Diario La Nación), a radio station (Radio 970 AM), a hotel (Crowne Plaza), a restaurant (Lo de Osvaldo), a real estate (karmar), two tobacco factories (tabacalera boqueron) and (tabacalera montecarlo) one of them having a worth of more than 90 million dollars, the only iron bottle cap factory in the country, owner of a luxurious private neighborhood in San Bernardino (Sunset Hills), and more.

He is one of the biggest shareholders in many businesses like Cervepar, De la Sobera Group and Coca-Cola in Paraguay. He is also known for having a lot of very valuable ranches and being one of the biggest cattle (cow) sellers in the country. Dominguez has several properties around the country and also around Brazil.

In 2002, he lost in the primary elections of the Colorado Party which would have put him as the party representative for the national presidential elections, had he won.

Criticism 
Once linked to former dictator Alfredo Stroessner through his brother Humberto Domínguez Dibb (Stroessner's son-in-law), Osvaldo Domínguez Dibb insists that the Paraguayan general was indeed a great president. Osvaldo Domínguez Dibb has been accused by Brazilian authorities of being a major smuggler of cigarettes into Brazil.

Personal life
He made most of his money in times of Ex Dictator Alfredo Stroessner.

He is married to Peggy Wilson-Smith.

Their son is Alejandro Dominguez, president of CONMEBOL, a vice-president of FIFA and a member of the FIFA Executive Committee.

References

1940 births
Living people
Club Olimpia presidents
Colorado Party (Paraguay) politicians
Paraguayan people of Lebanese descent